Piper chaba is commonly called piper chilli and it's a flowering vine in the family Piperaceae that is native to South and Southeast Asia. P. chaba is called চুই ঝাল (Chui Jhal) or চই ঝাল (Choi Jhal) in the Khulna Division of Bangladesh, and the states of Tripura and West Bengal in India. P. chaba is found throughout India, and other warmer regions of Asia including Malaysia, Indonesia, Singapore and Sri Lanka.

It is a creeper plant that spreads on the ground. It may also grow around large trees. The flowers are monoecious and blossom during the monsoon. The fruit is red when ripe, which turns dark brown or black when dry.

Culinary use

People in Bangladesh's south-western districts like Khulna Division cut down the stem, roots, peel the skin and chop it into small pieces - and cook them with meat and fish, especially with mutton and beef curry. Chuijhal Meat Curry is a very popular dish in Khulna region. The spicy pungent flavor of Choi Jhal is a year-round additive spice. In Indian states of West Bengal and Tripura people use this spice similarly with exception to some people in South Bengal who prepare a complete dish with the Chapa as the base ingredient, it is very spicy. In Thailand, P. chaba is known commonly as dee plee and also referred to as "Thai long pepper" and it is consumed both in fresh and dried forms. Ground by mortar and pestle, P. chaba is an ingredient in a variety of Thai sauces and pastes, and it is added to soups to mute excessively strong fish flavors.

In Bangladesh, the stems of the plant are used as a spice in meat and fish dishes. In most countries of South and South-East Asia, the fruit of the Piperaceae vines is well known as a spice and is called the "long pepper". However, in Bangladesh the use of Choi Jhal is unique, because the twigs, stems or roots of P. chaba – not the fruit – are used as a spice.  It is a relatively expensive spice in Bangladesh, and the roots are usually more expensive than the stems because of their stronger aroma. The taste is similar to horseradish.

External links
To learn its medicinal properties, this link can be helpful:
 http://www.ewubd.edu/~faiz/piper_paper.pdf

chaba
Taxa named by William Trelease